Nishita Nirmal Mhatre was the Acting Chief Justice of Calcutta High Court in India. She joined office on 1 December 2016 and retired as the acting chief justice of the Calcutta High Court on 18 September 2017. During her tenure as the Acting Chief justice, she presided over the high-profile sting operation of the Trinamool Congress leaders popularly known as the Narada case and ordered CBI investigation in that case.

Early life 
Mharte was born on 20 September 1955. For her post-secondary education, Mhatre attended Sophia College and Government Law College, Mumbai. Apart from law, Mharte also studied microbiology.

Legal profession 
In 1978, Mharte began her legal career with the Bar Council of Maharashtra and Goa before working in tribunals. From the 2000s to 2010s, she worked as a judge in the Bombay High Court and Calcutta High Court. While working for Calcutta in 2016, Mharte became a Chief Justice after the retirement of the Chief Justice Girish Chandra Gupta.

References 

21st-century Indian judges
Judges of the Calcutta High Court
Judges of the Bombay High Court
21st-century Indian women judges